Rysa Little, commonly referred to as Rysa, is an uninhabited island in the Orkney archipelago in Scotland.

It is situated in the Scapa Flow just offshore from the much larger island of Hoy and nearby is the islet of Cava. Between Rysa Little and Fara lies Gutter Sound, the scene of the mass-scuttling of the interned German Imperial High Seas Fleet in 1919.

Many of the smaller South Isles of Orkney lost their resident populations during the course of the twentieth century, but Rysa Little has not been inhabited since earlier times.

See also
List of Orkney islands

Footnotes

Uninhabited islands of Orkney